Endress+Hauser (Endress and Hauser) is a Swiss-based globally operating process and laboratory instrumentation and automation supplier. The family company achieved net sales of approximately 2.9 billion euros in 2021 with a total workforce of more than 15,000.

Company structure
The group comprises 134 companies in 48 countries. The group's parent company is Endress+Hauser AG in Reinach, Switzerland: a stock corporation under Swiss law whose shares are not listed on a stock exchange. Shareholders are the families of the eight children of company founder Georg H Endress, each holding 12 percent. An additional 4 percent has been placed in the non-profit Georg H Endress Foundation.

Today, Endress+Hauser provides sales and support in 125 countries and manufactures in the major economic regions. The company operates production facilities in Brazil, Germany, the United States, China, France, India, the Czech Republic, Italy, Japan, Singapore, the United Kingdom and Switzerland.

Products, services, customers
Endress+Hauser manufactures electronic instruments for process automation including level, flow, pressure and temperature measurement; instruments for liquid, solids and gas analysis; data acquisition and system integration. Under the Analytik Jena brand, the group markets analytical instruments and bioanalytical systems for laboratories.

Commercial customers mainly operate in the food and beverage, chemical, life sciences, oil and gas, water and wastewater, power and energy and primaries and metals industries. In the laboratory business, the group also serves customers from healthcare and academia.

History
The company was founded as L Hauser KG on 1 February 1953 by Swiss engineer Georg H. Endress (1924–2008) and German banker Ludwig Hauser (1895–1975). Starting capital was a modest 2,000 deutschemarks; the first ‘operating facility’ was a room in Hauser’s apartment in Lörrach, Germany. The business has traded under the name Endress+Hauser since 1957.

In the beginning, the company sold innovative level instruments produced by the British company Fielden Electronics. Soon after, Georg H Endress started to develop his own devices. In 1955, he registered his first patent and set up a production facility.

The company expanded the portfolio by adding new measurement principles and pursued business opportunities in other countries. The first foreign subsidiary was established in 1960 in the Netherlands. In 1968, a holding company was registered in Switzerland. In 1970, Endress+Hauser entered the US and Japanese markets.

In 1975, co-founder Ludwig Hauser died; the Endress family became sole shareholder. In the following years, the company expanded its offering through acquisitions and start-ups. Measurement value recording, liquid analysis and flow measurement engineering were added as new fields of activity, followed later by pressure and temperature measurement technologies.

Klaus Endress, the second-eldest son of the company founder, took over as the group’s CEO in 1995. By that time, Endress+Hauser had grown into a global company with 4,339 employees and net sales of 679.6 million Swiss francs.

In 2005, Endress+Hauser acquired Innovative Sensor Technology IST AG, a Swiss-based provider of physical, chemical and biological sensors with operations in Ebnat-Kappel, Switzerland, and Roznov, Czech Republic.

In 2008, Georg H Endress died. The shareholder family had created a family charter while the company founder was still alive. It states, “Endress+Hauser shall remain a family company oriented toward sustainable success.”

In 2013, Endress+Hauser entered the laboratory instrumentation business with the acquisition of German company Analytik Jena AG. Additional takeovers (SpectraSensors Inc., Kaiser Optical Systems Inc., SensAction AG, Blue Ocean Nova AG) strengthened the segment of process analysis and measurement of quality parameters. Besides this strategic focal point, the issue of digitalization was another major factor of influence in company development.

On 1 January 2014, Matthias Altendorf took over as CEO of the Endress+Hauser Group from Klaus Endress, who became president of the Supervisory Board. At that time, the company generated net sales of €1.814 billion and employed 11,919 staff worldwide. Although not a member of the family, the new CEO has been with the company for more than 25 years. He promotes digitalization and applications for the Industrial Internet of Things and wants to further develop the offering in the field of laboratory and process analysis.

Endress+Hauser in the US 

Endress+Hauser Inc. opened the first US office in Beverly, Massachusetts, in 1970 and moved to Greenwood, Indiana, in 1973. For a while E+H had a subsidiary Ondyne, Inc in Concord, California that primarily made moisture measurement instruments. In 1991 this facility was closed and most of the personnel moved to Greenwood, IN. In addition to its own sales organization, the company relies on a nationwide network of select representatives to support customers. Additionally, the group offers lab and field calibration services  and operates various process training facilities in the US. Endress+Hauser produces flow, level, pressure and temperature instruments in Greenwood, Indiana, and liquid analysis technology in Anaheim, California; Kaiser Optical Systems Inc. manufactures Raman analyzers in Ann Arbor, Michigan; and SpectraSensors Inc. with headquarters in Houston, Texas, assembles its TDLAS gas analyzers in Rancho Cucamonga, California. According to Endress+Hauser, 80 percent of the instruments delivered in the US are made in the US. The laboratory business is represented by Analytik Jena US LLC, based in Upland, California. The group employs more than 850 people in the US; the representative network accounts for another 350 sales engineers and service technicians. Todd Lucey has been managing director of Endress+Hauser Inc. since 2004.

Endress+Hauser in the UK 

Endress+Hauser Ltd was established in 1968 and today employs 210 people. The company provides products, and services to customers in Britain and designs and manufactures industrial temperature sensors. The managing director is Steven Endress, a grandson of the company founder. The laboratory business in the UK is represented by Analytik Jena UK Ltd in London  From its premises in Richmond, North Yorkshire, MHT Technology Ltd supplies the oil, gas and petrochemical industries with inventory management and stock reconciliation systems.

Endress+Hauser in Canada
Endress+Hauser Canada Ltd was founded in 1990. Today, more than 150 employees serve customers from headquarters in Burlington, Ontario, and offices in Montreal, Quebec, Calgary and Edmonton, Alberta. Technical representatives are based in Windsor, Saskatoon and Vancouver. In Atlantic Canada, Northern Ontario, Manitoba, Calgary (well servicing) and British Columbia, sales are handled through representatives. The managing director is Anthony Varga.

Endress+Hauser in South Africa  
Endress+Hauser (Pty) Ltd in Sandton was founded in 1984. With 120 employees, the company serves the South African market as well as customers in other subequatorial African countries such as Botswana, Democratic Republic of Congo, Kenya, Malawi, Mozambique, Namibia, Tanzania, Uganda, Zambia and Zimbabwe. Bernhard Klöss has been managing director of Endress+Hauser (Pty) Ltd since the beginning of 2019. In the country’s Broad-Based Black Economic Empowerment program, Endress+Hauser has reached a level 4 rating.

Endress+Hauser in Australia
Established in 2001 after a period of distributor representation, Endress+Hauser Australia Pty Ltd, based in North Ryde, New South Wales, has developed as a full-fledged subsidiary. The company serves customers throughout the country.

Endress+Hauser in Ireland

The group’s sales organization in Ireland was established in 1979, initially as an agency. Today Endress+Hauser (Ireland) Ltd, with offices in Kildare and Cork and 26 staff, assists customers nationwide. The managing director is Christophe Roche. In addition, the group has held a minority stake in the engineering-based calibration management software development company CompuCal Calibration Solutions Ltd, Little Island, since 2012.

Endress+Hauser in India
The group's sales organization in India was established in 1994. Today Endress + Hauser India Pvt. Ltd with 9 branch offices assist customers across India.

References

Electronics companies of Switzerland
Manufacturing companies of Switzerland
Instrument-making corporations
Electronics companies established in 1953
Swiss brands
Technology companies of Switzerland
Reinach, Basel-Landschaft
Multinational companies headquartered in Switzerland